Rubicene is a polycyclic aromatic hydrocarbon  that consists of two benzene and an anthracene. They are each linked by two carbon–carbon bonds. Dilute solutions of rubicene emit strong yellow fluorescence.  It's synthesized from fluorenone by reduction of calcium or magnesium, or it can be obtained by reacting with dihalogenated diphenylanthracene as raw material. It can also be obtained by reacting 9,10-diphenylanthracene and 3 parts of DDQ in dichloromethane in the presence of triflic acid.

Reference

Further reading
 Pragst, Fritz; Stoesser, Reinhard. Use of bis(1,2,4,6-tetramethyl-1,4-dihydro-4-pyridinyl) as a reducing agent for the generation of organic anion radicals in EPR spectroscopy . Zeitschrift fuer Chemie, 1985. 25 (6): 222. .
 

Polycyclic aromatic hydrocarbons